The Bubliai Reservoir is an artificial lake in Kėdainiai District Municipality, central Lithuania. It was created in 1980, when a dam on the Obelis river had been built next to Bubliai village. In 2002, the dam was reconstructed and a small hydroelectric plant (of 160 kW) has been built.

The Bubliai Reservoir is used for irrigation, fishery, and hydroelectric energy production. The fish species inhabiting the reservoir are carp, pike, catfish, roach, and bream.

Shores of the reservoir are quite straight, low. The reservoir is surrounded mostly by agriculture lands. Some other smaller ponds and reservoirs (the Kapliai Reservoir, the Piltyna Reservoir, the Aristava Reservoir) empty into the Bubliai Reservoir.

The Bubliai Reservoir itself empties into the Juodkiškiai Reservoir. The dam uses siphon spillway.

References

Lakes of Kėdainiai District Municipality
Reservoirs in Lithuania